Yerba is an unincorporated community in McDowell County, West Virginia, United States.

References

Unincorporated communities in McDowell County, West Virginia
Unincorporated communities in West Virginia
Coal towns in West Virginia